Zsigmond Vincze (1 July 1874, Zombor – 30 June 1935, Budapest) was a Hungarian pianist, conductor and composer who wrote several very successful operettas.

Life and career
After having trained in Budapest, Vincze became conductor of the Király Szinház in the city, and later was musical director of the opera in Debrecen. He achieved his first success in 1909 and went on to compose a number of other well-received stage works over the following 20 years.

The song “Szép vagy, gyönyörű vagy Magyarország” (“Hungary, you are beautiful and splendid” from his operetta A hamburgi menyasszony (The bride from Hamburg) was quoted by Bartók in the fourth movement of his Concerto for Orchestra.
He provided music for Az utolsó bohém (The last Bohemian) in 1913.

Selected compositions
 Tilos a csók – Budapest, 8 October 1909
 Limonádé ezredes – Budapest, 5 September 1912
 A cigánygrófné – Budapest, 13 March 1920
 A hamburgi menyasszony – Budapest, 31 January 1922
 Az erősebb – Budapest, 1924
 Annabál – Budapest, 1925
 Huszárfogás – Budapest, 4 April 1930

Discography
As a pianist, Vincze accompanied songs on Hungarian records labels before the First World War, as well as accompanying Jenő Hubay in works by Bach, Mozart and Hubay himself.

References

1874 births
1935 deaths
Hungarian classical composers
Hungarian musical theatre composers
Hungarian male classical composers
Hungarian opera composers
Male opera composers
Composers from the Austro-Hungarian Empire